The 2007–08 Wyoming Cowboys basketball team represented the University of Wyoming during the 2007–08 NCAA Division I men's basketball season. The Cowboys, led by first year head coach Heath Schroyer, played their home games at the Arena-Auditorium as members of the Mountain West Conference.

Roster

Ogirri sat out the 2007–08 season per NCAA transfer rules

Schedule and results

Wyoming Cowboys basketball seasons
Wyoming
Wyoming Cowboys bask
Wyoming Cowboys bask